(489 — 7 January 507) was the 25th legendary Emperor of Japan, according to the traditional order of succession.

No firm dates can be assigned to this Emperor's life or reign, but he is conventionally considered to have reigned from 12 January 499 to 7 January 507.

Legendary narrative
Buretsu is considered to have ruled the country during the late-fifth century and early-sixth century, but there is a paucity of information about him. There is insufficient material available for further verification and study.

He had no children.

Buretsu's reign
Buretsu's contemporary title would not have been tennō, as most historians believe this title was not introduced until the reigns of Emperor Tenmu and Empress Jitō. Rather, it was presumably , meaning "the great king who rules all under heaven".

Buretsu is described as an extremely wicked historical figure. The Nihonshoki describes the 11-year-old Buretsu, in 500, cutting open the stomach of a pregnant woman and observing the embryo. In addition to his acts of personal cruelty, during his reign the general welfare of the nation declined severely. According to the Tenshō, supposedly compiled by Fujiwara no Hamanari, Buretsu was admonished by Ōtomo no Kanamura. Nihonshoki likened his debauchery to Di Xin of the Shang dynasty, but the record in Kojiki has no such indication. There are several theories on this difference. Some believe that this was to justify and praise his successor Emperor Keitai, who took over under questionable circumstances, not having been in a position of immediate succession. In history textbooks available before and during World War II, the negative parts of Buretsu's record were intentionally omitted.

If Emperor Keitai began a new dynasty as some historians believe, then Buretsu is the last Emperor of the first recorded dynasty of Japan.

The actual site of Buretsu's grave is not known. The Emperor is traditionally venerated at a memorial Shinto shrine (misasagi) at Nara.

The Imperial Household Agency designates this location as Buretsu's mausoleum. It is formally named Kataoka no Iwatsuki no oka no kita no misasagi.

Consorts and children
Empress:

Ancestry

See also
 Emperor of Japan
 List of Emperors of Japan
 Imperial cult
 Prince Junda, dispatched to Japan after a Korean emissary was taken hostage at Buretsu's initiative

Notes

References
 Aston, William George. (1896).  Nihongi: Chronicles of Japan from the Earliest Times to A.D. 697. London: Kegan Paul, Trench, Trubner.  
 Brown, Delmer M. and Ichirō Ishida, eds. (1979).  Gukanshō: The Future and the Past. Berkeley: University of California Press. ;  
 Ponsonby-Fane, Richard Arthur Brabazon. (1959).  The Imperial House of Japan. Kyoto: Ponsonby Memorial Society. 
 Titsingh, Isaac. (1834). Nihon Ōdai Ichiran; ou,  Annales des empereurs du Japon.  Paris: Royal Asiatic Society, Oriental Translation Fund of Great Britain and Ireland.  
 Varley, H. Paul. (1980). Jinnō Shōtōki: A Chronicle of Gods and Sovereigns. New York: Columbia University Press. ;  

 
 

Japanese emperors
489 births
507 deaths
People of Kofun-period Japan
5th-century monarchs in Asia
6th-century monarchs in Asia
5th-century Japanese monarchs
6th-century Japanese monarchs